Barbara Hawcroft (born 13 October 1950) is an Australian former professional tennis player. She is the younger sister of squash player Marion Jackman.

Hawcroft was a quarter-finalist at the 1972 Australian Open and twice reached the third round at Wimbledon.

References

External links
 
 

1950 births
Living people
Australian female tennis players
Tennis players from Brisbane